The Sisters of the Holy Family of Nazareth are a Roman Catholic religious institute that was founded in Rome in 1875 by Blessed Mary of Jesus the Good Shepherd (Franciszka Siedliska). The Sisters of the Holy Family are an apostolic, international congregation, located on four continents and in thirteen countries. There are five provinces in the United States. A Sister of this congregation is identified by the initials CSFN (Latin for "Congregatio Sororum Sacrae Familiae de Nazareth"; English: "Congregation of the Sisters of the Holy Family of Nazareth") placed after her name.

They should not to be confused with the Sisters of Nazareth from Israel with convents in Nazareth and Shefa-Amr, nor with the larger Sisters of Nazareth organisation.

History

The Congregation of the Holy Family of Nazareth was founded in Rome, Italy in 1875 by Frances Siedliska, a Polish noblewoman. From Rome, the Congregation spread quickly.

In 1885, Mother Mary of Jesus the Good Shepherd and eleven sisters journeyed to Chicago, Illinois, where they had been invited to minister to the needs of Polish immigrant children and families. There they staffed two schools and an orphanage. The Congregation soon expanded its services in the Midwest. They continue to serve throughout Illinois, Indiana, Pennsylvania, New York, Connecticut, Texas, Michigan and Ohio. The sisters operate a high school for girls, Nazareth Academy, in Philadelphia.

The sisters opened their first hospital in Poland in Wadowice in 1897.

Ministry
The sisters have served in schools, and in child care services, care of the elderly, retreat work, and in the parish, prison, and youth ministry.

Sisters continue to be engaged in various areas of healthcare and presently minister as hospital chaplains, nurses, therapists, and lab technicians, attending to the sick, the elderly, and the infirm.

Provinces 

As of 2022, there are over 1,000 members in Australia, Belarus, England, France, Israel, Italy, Lithuania, the Philippines, Poland, Puerto Rico, Russia, Spain, Ukraine, and the United States of America.

Blessed members 
Beatified members of the Sisters of the Holy Family include Sister Stella and her companions, who were martyred on 1 August 1943 in Nowogródek, Poland (now Belarus), and who were beatified on 5 March 2000, as well as the foundress, Frances Siedliska, beatified on 23 April 1989. Her feast day is 21 November.

See also 
 Holy Family

References

External links 
 Holy Family Province, USA
 Holy Spirit Province, Australia

Catholic female orders and societies
Catholic missionary orders
Religious organizations established in 1875
Catholic religious institutes established in the 19th century